Pozdravlyayem! (Russian: «Поздравляем!» Congratulations!, Op. 111) is a 1975 opera by Mieczysław Weinberg to his own Russian libretto after the Yiddish play Mazel Tov by Sholem Aleichem. The plot follows closely the text of Aleichem's play, but emphasising the class conflict to placate the Soviet censor, for whom otherwise a Jewish topic may have proved problematic. The opera premiered in Moscow in 1983. Present at the premiere was Vladimir Stoupel who conducted the premiere outside Russia at the Konzerthaus Berlin in 2012.

Recording
Wir gratulieren! - in German, version for chamber ensemble by Henry Koch, Katia Guedes, Anna Gütter, Olivia Saragosa, Jeff Martin, Robert Elibay-Hartong, Kammerakademie Potsdam, Vladimir Stoupel. Oehms, live from the Konzerthaus Berlin 2012, released 2020.

References

1975 operas
Compositions by Mieczysław Weinberg
Russian-language operas
Operas based on plays
Operas